The Mills of the Gods is an American silent film. It was the first three-reel "feature" directed by Ralph Ince; production company Vitagraph entrusted him with this longer project after being impressed by his work on the two-reel Double Danger.

Cast
L. Rogers Lytton as Lorenzo
Leo Delaney as Miguel
Rosemary Theby as Giulia
Zena Keefe as Maria, Giulia's Sister
George Cooper as Tano, an Instrument of Lorenzo's
Tefft Johnson as Piche, Miguel's Brother
Adele DeGarde as Rosa, Miguel's Daughter
Harry Northrub as DeWaldis, Giulia's Lawyer
Evelyn Dominicus as The She-Wolf
Mrs. Maurice Costello as The Nurse

Release
The Mills of the Gods was released domestically on November 4, 1912. The novel by George P. Dillenback was reissued by Grosset & Dunlap in a hardcover printing featuring stills from the film.

The film played in Rotterdam at the Parisien Theater from January 24 to 30, 1913, followed by a run at Amsterdam's Cinema Palace from February 28 to March 6. At the same time, at least one print was working its way through New Zealand, where it played in Sydenham in late February, in Whanganui in March, and in North Otago in May.

References

External links
 

1912 films
1912 drama films
Silent American drama films
American black-and-white films
Films directed by Ralph Ince
American silent short films
1912 short films
1910s American films